Friedrich Josias, Prince of Saxe-Coburg and Gotha (Friedrich Josias Carl Eduard Ernst Kyrill Harald; 29 November 1918 – 23 January 1998) was the head of the Ducal Family of Saxe-Coburg and Gotha and titular Duke of Saxe-Coburg and Gotha from 1954 until his death. He was a great-grandson of Queen Victoria.

Early life 
Friedrich Josias was born at Callenberg Castle, the third son and youngest child of Charles Edward, Duke of Saxe-Coburg and Gotha, and Princess Victoria Adelaide of Schleswig-Holstein-Sonderburg-Glücksburg. Charles Edward was forced to abdicate on 14 November 1918.

In 1938, he entered the Wehrmacht and participated in the occupation of Czechoslovakia, Poland and France. In 1941, he fought in Yugoslavia and the Soviet Union. He fell seriously ill in the winter of 1941. After his recovery, he fought as Oberleutnant in the Caucasus. In 1944, he was an Ordonnanzoffizier under Generalfeldmarschall Erwin Rommel on the French coast. He was stationed in June 1944 in Denmark under General von Hanneken, where he was captured by the British in May 1945 but released in autumn 1945.

The third of three sons, Friedrich Josias was not expected to succeed as head of the ducal family. However, his eldest brother, Johann Leopold, married unequally and renounced his rights in 1932, and his other brother (Hubertus) was killed in action in 1943, thus leaving Friedrich Josias as the heir apparent. He succeeded to the headship upon the death of his father on 6 March 1954.

Marriages and issue 
In Kassel on 25 January 1942, Friedrich Josias married his first cousin, Countess Viktoria-Luise of Solms-Baruth (13 March 1921 – 1 March 2003). This marriage ended in divorce on 19 September 1946. The couple had one son: 
Andreas Michael Armin Siegfried Friedrich Hans Hubertus (b. 21 March 1943).

In San Francisco on 14 February 1948, Friedrich Josias married secondly, Denyse Henrietta de Muralt (14 December 1923 – 25 April 2005). Friedrich Josias and Denyse were divorced on 17 September 1964. They had three children:
Maria Claudia Sibylla (22 May 1949 – 5 February 2016)
Beatrice Charlotte (15 July 1951)
Adrian Vinzenz Eduard (18 October 1955 – 30 August 2011)

In Hamburg on 30 October 1964, Friedrich Josias married his third wife, Katrin Bremme (22 April 1940 – 13 July 2011). This marriage was childless.

Friedrich Josias died, aged 79, in Amstetten, Austria.

References

Ancestry 

House of Saxe-Coburg and Gotha (United Kingdom)
Princes of Saxe-Coburg and Gotha
Princes of the United Kingdom
1918 births
1998 deaths
People from Coburg
German Army officers of World War II
Military personnel from Bavaria
Sons of monarchs